This is a list of things named after kings of Saudi Arabia.

Abdulaziz bin Abdul Rahman

Reign: 23 September 1932 – 9 November 1953
 King Abdulaziz Air Base
 King Abdulaziz Center For National Dialogue
 King Abdulaziz Center for World Culture
 King Abdulaziz City for Science and Technology
 King Abdul Aziz Historical Centre
 King Abdul Aziz Hospital, Mecca 
 King Abdulaziz International Airport
 King Abdulaziz Medical City, Riyadh
 King Abdulaziz Medical City, Jeddah
 King Abdul Aziz Military College
 King Abdul Aziz Mosque
 King Abdulaziz Naval Base
 King Abdul Aziz Port
 King Abdulaziz Public Library
 King Abdul Aziz Road, Kuwait
 King Abdul Aziz Stadium
 King Abdulaziz University
 King Abdulaziz University College of Health Sciences

Saud

Reign: 9 November 1953 – 2 November 1964
 King Saud Mosque
 King Saud University
 King Saud University College of Medicine
 King Saud Medical Complex
 King Saud Hospital, Onaizah
King Saud bin Abdulaziz University For Health Sciences

Faisal

Reign: 2 November 1964 – 25 March 1975
 King Faisal Foundation
 King Faisal Prize
 King Faisal Center for Research and Islamic Studies
 King Faisal University
 King Faisal Air Academy
 King Faisal Naval Base
 King Faisal Road, Madinah
 King Faisal Road, Mecca
 King Faisal Road, Jeddah
King Faisal Road, Riyadh
 King Faisal Road, Manama
 King Faisal Hospital, Mecca 
 King Faisal Specialist Hospital and Research Centre
 King Faisal Road Karachi Pakistan
King Faisal Hospital, Kigali, Rwanda

 Faisalabad, Pakistan
 King Faisal Mosque, Islamabad, Pakistan
 King Faisal Mosque, Sharjah, United Arab Emirates
 King Faisal Medical City, Abha 2.4 Billion Saudi Riyal Project (Under Construction)
 King Faisal Babes F.C.

Khalid
 Reign: 25 March 1975 – 13 June 1982
 King Khalid Eye Specialist Hospital 
 King Khaled Military City Airport
 King Khalid Air Base
 King Khalid Foundation
 King Khalid International Airport
 King Khalid Medical City
 King Khalid Military City
 King Khalid University
 King Khalid Royal Reserve
 King Khalid Wildlife Research Center

Fahad

Reign: 13 June 1982 – 1 August 2005
 King Fahad Academy
 King Fahad Academy (Germany)
 King Fahad Bridge
 King Fahad Causeway
 King Fahad Complex for the Printing of the Holy Quran
 King Fahad International Airport
 King Fahad International Stadium
 King Fahad Islamic Cultural Center
 King Fahad Medical City
 King Fahad Military Medical Complex, Dammam
 King Fahad Mosque (Edinburgh)
 King Fahad Mosque (Sarajevo)
 King Fahad National Library
 King Fahad Road, Jeddah
 King Fahd Road, Kuwait
 King Fahad Road, Mecca
 King Fahad Road, Riyadh 
 King Fahad School of Translation
 King Fahad Security College
 King Fahad Specialist Hospital, Buraidah
 King Fahad Specialist Hospital, Dammam
 King Fahad Stadium, Taif
 King Fahad University Hospital
 King Fahad University of Petroleum and Minerals
 King Fahad's Fountain
 Malek Fahad Islamic School

Abdullah 

Reign: 1 August 2005 – 23 January 2015
 King Abdullah Academy
 King Abdullah Bin Abdulaziz Airport
 King Abdullah City for Atomic and Renewable Energy
 King Abdullah Economic City
 King Abdullah Financial District
 King Abdullah Petroleum Studies and Research Center
 King Abdullah Port
 King Abdullah Bin Abdulaziz Science Park 
 King Abdullah Sport City Stadium
 King Abdullah Street, Jeddah
 King Abdullah Sports City
 King Abdullah University of Science and Technology
King Abdullah Park, Riyadh

Salman 

Reign: 23 January 2015 – present
 King Salman International Airport
 King Salman Center for Disability Research
 King Salman Central Library
 King Salman Global Maritime Industries Complex
 King Salman Humanitarian Aid and Relief Center
 King Salman Mosque, Taif
 King Salman Park, Riyadh
 King Salman Road, Riyadh
 King Salman Science Oasis
 King Salman Social Center
 King Salman Sport City Stadium
 King Salman World Rapid and Blitz Chess Championships
 Salman bin Abdulaziz Mosque
 King Salman Mosque

See also

House of Saud

References

Saudi Arabia-related lists
Named after Saudi kings
Saudi kings